A gravel pit is an open-pit mine for the extraction of gravel. Gravel pits often lie in river valleys where the water table is high, so they may naturally fill with water to form ponds or lakes. Old, abandoned gravel pits are normally used either as nature reserves, or as amenity areas for water sports, landfills and walking. In Germany former gravel or sand pits that have filled up with water are known as Baggersee ("power dug lake") and popular for recreational use.  In addition, many gravel pits in the United Kingdom have been stocked with freshwater fish such as the common carp to create coarse fishing locations.  Gravel and sand are mined for concrete, construction aggregate and other industrial mineral uses.

Gallery

See also
Borrow pit
Clay pit
Quarry
Rock (geology)
Granite
Stone industry
Mining engineering

References

Gravel Watch Ontario
Portland Cement Association
Pavement Interactive article on Aggregates
2006 USGS Minerals Yearbook: Stone, Crushed

Surface mining